Kenneth Kunde (1916-1928) was a politician in Wisconsin.

Biography
Kunde was born on 24 July 1916 in Oshkosh, Wisconsin. He attended what is now the University of Wisconsin-Oshkosh and served in the United States Army during World War II. Following the war, he was a member of the Wisconsin Army National Guard. Kunde was also a member of AMVETS. He died on January 28, 1992, in Sheboygan, Wisconsin.

Political career
Kunde was a candidate for the United States House of Representatives from Wisconsin's 6th congressional district in 1948 and 1950. He lost to incumbent Frank Bateman Keefe in 1948 and to William Van Pelt in 1950. Later, he was a delegate to the 1952 Democratic National Convention. Kunde became Chairman of the Winnebago County, Wisconsin Democratic Party in 1957. He was then elected to the Wisconsin State Assembly in 1962, 1964 and 1966. In 1967, he resigned from the Assembly.

Death
Kunde died January 28, 1992.

References

Politicians from Oshkosh, Wisconsin
Democratic Party members of the Wisconsin State Assembly
Military personnel from Wisconsin
United States Army soldiers
United States Army personnel of World War II
University of Wisconsin–Oshkosh alumni
1916 births
1992 deaths
20th-century American politicians